SBS Radio is an Australian radio network owned by the Special Broadcasting Service directed towards newly arrived immigrants in Australia. SBS Radio originally began as two stations based in Melbourne and Sydney, set up to provide pre-recorded information about the then-new Medibank health care system in languages other than English. Nowadays, the network targets the estimated 4+ million Australians who speak a language other than English at home with programs in 68 languages.

Like SBS Television, SBS Radio supplements its government funding with paid-for information campaigns for government agencies and non-profit organisations as well as commercial advertising and sponsorship.

History and Evolution 
The history of SBS Radio goes back to the 1970s when the government started considering the demand for broadcasting in languages other than English after a mass-influx of foreign-born populace post World War Two. In January 1975, Al Grassby, the Commissioner of Community Relations at the time, approached future members of the SBS executive board about his intention to start up two experimental radio stations in Sydney and Melbourne, which would almost always broadcast in non-English languages, on a budget of around 67,000 dollars. The amount was sufficient to pay for two broadcasters per program and rented studios in the two cities.

After some months of planning, on June 9, 1975, the first ethnic station, 2EA (EA standing for Ethnic Australia), opened in Sydney by Al Grassby, with the first language heard on 2EA being Greek.  Not long afterwards, on June 23, 3EA opened in Melbourne. Both stations operated under 3-month temporary licenses, with 42 hour per week schedules in seven and eight languages, respectively. The initial purposes of the stations wwere to inform ethnic communities about proposed changes in the healthcare system via the new Medibank scheme. By the end of the year the two stations were broadcasting in Arabic, Cantonese, Croatian, German, Greek, Hebrew, Italian, Latvian, Lithuanian, Macedonian, Maltese, Mandarin, Polish, Russian, Serbian, Slovenian, Spanish, and Turkish.

Studios were first located at the 2CBA studios in Five Dock in Sydney, and in the Armstrong Audio Video studios in southern Melbourne. In May 1976, the Consultative Committee on Ethnic Broadcaster was founded to plan out the future of ethnic broadcasting. That same year, four new languages, Dutch, French, Polish and Romanian were added to 3EA's schedule; this pales in comparison to the nineteen languages added to 2EA's lineup, which included Armenian, Assyrian, Bangla, Czech, Dutch, Estonian, French, Gujarati, Hebrew, Hindi, Hungarian, Latvian, Lithuanian, Portuguese, Punjabi, Slovak, Tamil, Ukrainian and Urdu. It was also around this time that the two stations had ceased to be known as "experimental stations", and that they had become permanent.

During 1977, programming and language coverage expanded to 119 hours per week in 33 languages on 2EA and 103 hours per week in 22 languages on 3EA. Of the 33 languages on 2EA, three languages, Finnish, Romanian, and Vietnamese, had only been added that year, and of the 22 on 3EA, four languages, Bulgarian, Estonian, Hungarian, and Portuguese, were new additions. 

In November 1977, the Broadcasting and Television Act 1942 was amended to form the Special Broadcasting Service, which commenced operation and assumed responsibility for 2EA and 3EA on 1 January 1978. 3EA also found a new studio site at 35 Bank Street in South Melbourne.

By 1978 both stations were broadcasting a total of 68 languages a week and a total of 229 hours in total. In April a soccer match from Yugoslavia was regarded as the very first live overseas broadcast on 2/3EA, and in June, 2EA moved from Five Dock to 257 Clarence Street in Sydney. Thirteen new languages, Albanian, Armenian, Czech, Danish, Finnish, Hindi, Norwegian, Punjabi, Russian, Slovak, Swedish, Ukrainian and Urdu, were also added to 3EA that year, while only two, Filipino and Tongan, were added to 2EA's schedule. The following year 2EA began broadcasting in Queensland through the community radio station 4EB. Eleven new languages were also added to the two station's schedule; six, Cantonese, Indonesian, Khmer, Mandarin, Sinhalese and Tamil on 3EA, and five, Danish, Fijian, Korean, Norwegian and Swedish on 2EA.

The 1980s saw a new-look SBS executive board appointed, with former Rugby captain and Lord Mayor of Sydney Sir Nicholas Shehadie as its Chair. Five new languages in total were added to the station's lineup, three in Melbourne and two in Sydney. The decade also saw the 1982 World Cup being broadcast on the airwaves, with live commentary of some matches broadcast in several languages. Sinhalese was added to 2EA's schedule, whereas Lao and an Aboriginal-centred program was added to 3EA. Talkback was also introduced and several English programs were discontinued on 3EA to allow airtime for other languages. Khmer was also added to 2EA's schedule. 

In August 1986, the government proposed legislation that would amalgamate SBS into the ABC. This was highly unpopular with ethnic-minority communities, and caused protests from both SBS staff and communities, resulting in the Prime Minister of Australia, Bob Hawke, to announce in 1987 that the proposed amalgamation would not proceed. One year later 2EA entered new facilities in Bondi Junction, with 3EA moving to premises in the Australian Ballet Centre.

In the 1990s 2EA established a live feed to the Soviet space station MIR for a live broadcast with two of its cosmonauts, and with the fall of the Berlin Wall in October, 2EA also broadcast government proceedings from Berlin. Cook Islands Māori was added to both station's schedules, whereas Fijian, Kurdish, Samoan, and Tongan were added to 3EA. Samoan was later added to 2EA's schedule the following year. 1992 saw SBS attempt a restructuring of its staff, which resulted in a strike against the move. Filipino, New Zealand Maori, and Thai were added to 3EA, Persian-Farsi saw its debut on 2EA in 1992, with Dari added to 3EA's schedule the following year. 

By 1994 SBS had moved into its current premises in Artamon and had renamed 2EA and 3EA to SBS Radio Sydney and SBS Radio Melbourne. The availability of FM frequencies allowed SBS to double the broadcasting time for both its stations, thus equally dividing broadcast languages into both AM and FM. The World Cup was also broadcast on FM, with the final also heard on the national service. Dari was soon added to SBS Radio Sydney, with Burmese and an African English program also available. 

The following year, a now-defunct English program known as "World View" was introduced, in conjunction with the station's 20th anniversary. In 1996, SBS would secure an exclusive scoop on how five Australians were murdered in East Timor, with the network itself soon securing an interview with Nobel Laureate Jose Ramos Horta.

In 1999, in light of the Kosovar crisis in the Balkans, SBS temporarily increased the broadcast times of the Albanian program to cater for the influx of Kosovar refugees who were coming to Australia. In December, fashionista Carla Zampatti replaced Sir Nicholas Shehadie as the SBS Chair. Following 9/11 a noted increase in news production was seen, and programs broadcast in Afghan languages had airtimes increased.

In 2003 SBS underwent a historic review of its radio operations, dropping four languages, Irish Gaelic, Scots Gaelic, Welsh, and Belarusian, while introducing new programs in Amharic, Malay, Nepali, and Somali. At the same time, SBS Radio Melbourne relocated to its current premises in the Alfred Deakin Building in Federation Square. 

Ten years later, a similar review was undertaken, introducing programs in Malayalam, Pashto, Swahili, Dinka, Hmong, and Tigrinya.

On 20 November 2017, SBS Radio reorganized its radio service, which included dropping services in twelve languages that either weren't as widely spoken, or had communities who weren't in need of a dedicated service in their language, based on the national census that was conducted by the government the previous year. These languages include Cook Islands Maori, Fijian, Kannada, Norwegian, Swedish, Tongan, the African-centred English program, as well as Danish, Latvian, Lithuanian, Malay, Maori, whose programs were in recess at the time of the of reorganisation. Seven new languages were subsequently introduced in podcast form, including Hakha Chin, Karen, Kirundi, Mongolian, Rohingya, Telugu, and Tibetan. 

In November 2022, SBS once again reorganised their radio services based on the 2021 national census, intending on dropping the Albanian, Bulgarian, Finnish, Romanian, Slovak, and Slovenian programs, and replacing them with Bislama, Malay, Oromo, and Tetum. SBS also intends to recommit to its Telugu service, while also introducing new content directed at Afrikaans speakers through the Dutch program and new content for Hazaragi speakers through the Dari services.

Programming and content 

Most programs contain a mix of news, current affairs, sport, community information and music relating to a specific ethnic or language group. The exception is the English language NITV Radio program, and overnight programming from the BBC World Service. Programs with large communities such as Greek and Mandarin also have talkback segments in the last quarter of the program.

A program is hosted by maximum two hosts, and usually includes a pre-recorded or pre-written Acknowledgment of Country, which acknowledges the land of the studios which the program is broadcasting from. SBS Radio broadcasts programs from either of its Sydney or Melbourne studios. Some programs may be primarily broadcast from one of the two locations owing to historical reasons, for example the Albanian program being primarily broadcast from Melbourne due to being first added to the Melbourne radio schedule (See above for chronology of language additions)

Radio Stations
SBS Radio has three main radio services, Radio 1, Radio 2 and Radio 3, as well as a national FM service. Radio 1 is available on AM in Sydney, Melbourne, Canberra and Wollongong (1107, 1224, 1440 and 1485 respectively, and can also be listened to in FM on the SBS Radio app) while Radio 2 is available on FM in Sydney, Melbourne and Canberra (97.7, 93.1 and 105.5) and on AM in Wollongong (1035). Radio 3 is only available on digital platforms. It broadcasts the BBC World Service on all days of the week unless of special circumstances. The national service (branded simply as SBS Radio) is available throughout the rest of the nation through FM broadcasting (except in Newcastle, where it is available on AM) and on the Viewer Access Satellite Television satellite service, and is composed of material from Radios 1, 2 and 3. Additionally, a few community stations in areas without dedicated SBS Radio transmitters carry some SBS Radio content.

Radio 1, Radio 2 and Radio 3 are all available nationwide through digital terrestrial television, through DAB+ digital radio in available areas, on satellite from free-to-air Optus D1 and Optus B3 C-band satellite transmissions, and on major subscription television services (such as Foxtel). Until the launch of Radio 3 in April 2013, programs available on Radio 1 and Radio 2 varied depending on the platform and the location: for example, digital radio and television in Brisbane largely followed scheduling in Sydney, while digital radio and television in Adelaide and Perth largely followed scheduling in Melbourne.

On digital radio in Sydney, Melbourne, Brisbane, Adelaide, Perth and Canberra, SBS has some additional digital-only services: SBS Chill, a mix of chillout and world music; SBS PopAsia, a mixture of J-pop, K-pop and C-pop; SBS PopDesi, a mixture of Bhangra, Bollywood music and South Asian pop music; SBS Arabic 24, a 24-hour Arabic radio station, which uses BBC Arabic programming, and SBS PopAraby, featuring Arabic pop music. All of these services are also available online.

SBS Radio 3 began broadcasting 29 April 2013. It is available on VAST, DAB+, DTV and Online. Radio 3 services were added to all FOXTEL/Pay TV platforms, including Austar and Optus from 2 September 2013.

SBS Radio 4 used to relay BBC World Service, however on 18 April 2019, all programs on SBS Radio 4 were transferred to SBS Radio 3 in 2018, and Radio 4 is mostly defunct.

The old slogans were The many voices of one Australia, Six Billion Stories and Counting..., and Seven Billion Stories and Counting... and the current one is A World of Difference.

Languages 
All languages are available on the national service unless otherwise noted.

On 20 November 2017, SBS Radio reorganized its radio service, which included dropping services in twelve languages that either weren't as widely spoken, or had communities who weren't in need of a dedicated service in their language, based on the national census that was conducted by the government the previous year. SBS Radio will also re-organize its radio service once more in November 2022, based on the 2021 national census.

Broadcast on Radio 1:

Aboriginal (as NITV Radio)1
Albanian
Amharic
Armenian2
Bosnian
Bulgarian2
Cantonese
Croatian
Dinka
English (as SBS World News Radio and overnight programming)
Estonian (this program is in recess)2 
Finnish
French
Greek
Hebrew
Hungarian (this program is in recess)
Japanese
Khmer
Korean
Macedonian
Mandarin
Polish
Romanian2
Samoan
Serbian
Slovenian2
Tigrinya
Vietnamese
Yiddish

Broadcast on Radio 2:

Arabic (as SBS Arabic24)
Assyrian
Bengali
Burmese
Czech (this program is in recess)2
Dari
Dutch
Filipino
German
Gujarati
Hindi
Hmong
Indonesian
Italian
Kurdish
Lao (this program is in recess)
Malayalam
Maltese
Nepali
Pashto
Persian
Portuguese
Punjabi
Russian
Sinhalese
Slovak2
Somali
Spanish
Swahili
Tamil
Thai
Turkish
Ukrainian2
Urdu

New languages (in production)

Hakha Chin
Karen
Kirundi
Mongolian
Rohingya
Telugu
Tibetan

Previous languages 

African1
Belarusian
Cook Islands Maori
Danish
Fijian
Irish Gaelic
Kannada
Latvian
Lithuanian
Malay
Maori
Norwegian
Scots Gaelic
Swedish
Tongan
Welsh

Radio 1 also broadcasts segments of SBS Chill, either to fill up schedule gaps or to replace a program in recess. A radio version of SBS World News also aired on Radio 1 and currently airs in podcast format.

SBS Radio also broadcasts a variety of languages from BBC World Service and Deutsche Welle, as well as SBS Arabic24 also broadcasts the BBC Arabic programming.

Notes: All languages broadcast on Radio 1 were available (with reduced hours) on the national FM service, as well as all languages on Radio 2, except Dari, Lao and Maltese. None of the languages which were broadcast on Radio 3 were available on analogue radio.

The NITV Radio program is mostly conducted in English. The NITV Radio program used to be called Aboriginal and Living Black Radio. The German and Hebrew programs include English segments.
Not available on the national service.

Technical information

RDS trial 
SBS Radio began a trial of RDS (Radio Data System) in Sydney and Melbourne FM areas, in November 2012. RDS provides "Now" and "Next" information for the current and pending program information.

The RDS PS on FM radio is "SBSRadio" in Melbourne,  Sydney and other capital cities including Canberra and Hobart.

Rollout of EPG 
SBS began broadcasting the SBS Radio EPG (14 Day) on digital television (DTV) in November 2012.

Data is provided real time for DAB+ clients, and a forward schedule for DTV, by "Aim Rapid 2", from All In Media, see [www.digitalradioplus.com]. Pay television data is delivered by HWW.

SBS Radio Operations 
SBS Radio is managed, monitored and maintained via SBS Radio Operations. Distribution of SBS content is managed by third-parties such as Broadcast Australia and other specialist vendors.

Based in Sydney and Melbourne, the Radio Operations teams within SBS monitor, switch programming sources and co-ordinate resources within SBS to deliver content across all SBS markets.

References

External links 

Australian radio networks
Ethnic radio stations in Australia
Public radio in Australia
Radio stations established in 1975
Special Broadcasting Service